Doutai (Taori, Tolitai) is a Lakes Plain language of Irian Jaya, Indonesia. It is spoken in Toli-Dou village, located southwest of Taiyeve town.

Phonology
Doutai, like Kirikiri, has the fricativized high vowels iʼ and uʼ. There are 7 vowels in all :

{| 
| iʼ || uʼ
|-
| i || u
|-
| e || o
|-
| a || 
|}

References

Lakes Plain languages
Languages of western New Guinea